Cori or CORI may refer to:
 Cori cycle, the metabolic pathway where lactic acid produced in the muscles is converted into glucose in the liver
 Cori (lunar crater)
 Cori, a crater on Venus
 Cori (name)
 Cori, de Scheepsjongen (Cori, the Cabin Boy), a 1952–1993 Belgian comics series by Bob de Moor
 Cori, Lazio, a city in Italy
 Cori language
 Conference of Religious of Ireland
 Coordinadora Reusenca Independent
 Criminal Offender Record Information
 Zyuri or Cöri, a village in Tatarstan

See also 
 Coris (disambiguation)
 Kori (disambiguation)